KM Marlin is a patrol vessel in service with the Malaysian Coast Guard. Marlin was transferred in 2006 where ten crew from Malaysian Coast Guard were sent to take over command of the vessel. Apart from patrol duties, KM Marlin is also used as training vessel by the Malaysian Coast Guard.

References

Patrol vessels of Malaysia